The 2022 NCAA Division I Women's Swimming and Diving Championships were contested March 16–19, 2022 at the 40th annual NCAA-sanctioned swim meet to determine the team and individual national champions of Division I women's collegiate swimming and diving in the United States.

This year's events were hosted by the Georgia Institute of Technology at the McAuley Aquatic Center in Atlanta, Georgia.

Team standings

Note: Top 10 only
(H) = Hosts
(DC) = Defending champions
Full results

Swimming results

500 freestyle
Lia Thomas won the 500m freestyle, becoming the first transgender athlete to win an NCAA Division I title. The result was controversial, with some conservative figures calling the result unfair. Florida governor Ron DeSantis issued a symbolic gubernatorial proclamation declaring Emma Weyant the "rightful winner", but the governor does not have the power to determine the outcomes of NCAA competitions.

Diving results

See also
List of college swimming and diving teams

References

NCAA Division I Swimming And Diving Championships
NCAA Division I Women's Swimming and Diving Championships